Mikhail Sergeyevich Oparin (born 22 May 1993) is a Russian professional footballer who plays as a goalkeeper for Russian Premier League club Akhmat Grozny.

Club career
He made his debut in the Russian Second Division for FC Kaluga on 16 April 2013 in a game against FC Metallurg Vyksa.

He made his Russian Premier League debut for FC Tosno on 4 March 2018 in a game against FC SKA-Khabarovsk.

On 10 June 2022, Oparin signed a contract with Akhmat Grozny for a term of two years, with a team option to extend for one more year.

Honours

Club
Tosno
 Russian Cup: 2017–18

Career statistics

Notes

References

External links
 
 

1993 births
Sportspeople from Omsk
Living people
Russian footballers
Association football goalkeepers
FC Yenisey Krasnoyarsk players
FC Irtysh Omsk players
FC Tosno players
PFC Krylia Sovetov Samara players
FC SKA-Khabarovsk players
FC Amkar Perm players
FC Akhmat Grozny players
Russian Premier League players
Russian First League players
Russian Second League players